Kohan Chenar (also Romanized as Kohan Chenār and Kahn Chenār) is a village in Pariz Rural District, Pariz District, Sirjan County, Kerman Province, Iran. At the 2006 census, its population was 178, in 40 families.

References 

Populated places in Sirjan County